The 2011 Tamworth Borough Council election was held on 5 May 2011 to elect members of the Tamworth Borough Council. Ten seats were up for grabs; the Conservative Party won 75% of them with 48.70% of the votes.

Election result

Ward results

References

2011 English local elections
2011
2010s in Staffordshire